Marcos Calero Pérez (born 9 April 1993) is a Spanish professional footballer as a right back for Constància.

Club career
Born in Palma, Majorca, Balearic Islands, Marcos joined Villarreal's youth setup in 2007, aged 14. Initially a forward, he was converted into a right back and, on 20 July 2012, moved to CD Atlético Baleares.

In the 2012 summer, after making no senior appearances, Marcos joined Slovak 2. Liga club Zemplín Michalovce. He was an undisputed starter for the club during the 2014–15 campaign, as his side achieved promotion to Fortuna Liga.

Marcos made his Fortuna Liga debut on 18 July 2015, starting in a 0–1 home loss against AS Trenčín.

Honours
2. Liga: 2014–15

References

External links
Zemplín Michalovce official profile 
Futbalnet profile 

1993 births
Living people
Footballers from Palma de Mallorca
Spanish footballers
Association football defenders
CD Atlético Baleares footballers
Slovak Super Liga players
2. Liga (Slovakia) players
MFK Zemplín Michalovce players
Spanish expatriate footballers
Spanish expatriate sportspeople in Slovakia
Expatriate footballers in Slovakia
CE Constància players
Tercera División players